Euptera kinugnana is a butterfly in the family Nymphalidae. It is found in Kenya, Tanzania, Malawi, Mozambique and on Madagascar. The habitat consists of forests.

Adults feed on flowers as well as fermented fruit. They are on wing from August to December and from April to May.

The larvae feed on Bequaertiodendron natalense.

Subspecies
Euptera kinugnana kinugnana (Kenya, Tanzania, Malawi, Mozambique)
Euptera kinugnana insularis Collins, 1995 (Madagascar)

References

Butterflies described in 1889
Euptera
Butterflies of Africa
Taxa named by Henley Grose-Smith